Lineynoye is a rural locality (a selo) and the administrative center of Lineyninsky Selsoviet, Narimanovsky District, Astrakhan Oblast, Russia. The population was 832 as of 2010. There are 6 streets.

Geography 
Lineynoye is located 89 km southwest of Narimanov (the district's administrative centre) by road. Turkmenka is the nearest rural locality.

References 

Rural localities in Narimanovsky District